William Bacon Stevens (July 13, 1815 – June 11, 1887) was the fourth Bishop of the Episcopal Diocese of Pennsylvania.

Biography 
Stevens was educated at Phillips Academy, Andover and later studied medicine at Dartmouth College and the Medical College of South Carolina. After practicing medicine in Savannah, Georgia, for five years, he served as state historian of Georgia and at that time he began to study for the priesthood of the Episcopal Church.

He was ordained deacon on February 28, 1843, and later to the priesthood on January 7, 1844. He briefly served as professor of moral philosophy at the University of Georgia prior to being called as the rector of St. Andrew's Church of Philadelphia, Pennsylvania, in 1848. He received the Doctor of Divinity degree from the University of Pennsylvania and was later elected assistant bishop of the Diocese of Pennsylvania.

He was elected as a member of the American Philosophical Society in 1854.

He was consecrated on January 2, 1862, at St. Andrew's Church. Upon the death of Alonzo Potter in 1865, he became Bishop of Pennsylvania. He served in that office and as bishop of the American Episcopal churches in Europe until his death.

Works
 The Parables of the New Testament Practically Unfolded

References

External links

 Documents by William Bacon Stevens from Project Canterbury

1815 births
1887 deaths
People from Bath, Maine
Dartmouth College alumni
University of Pennsylvania alumni
Phillips Academy alumni
University of Georgia faculty
19th-century American physicians
19th-century American Episcopalians
Episcopal bishops of Pennsylvania
Members of the American Philosophical Society
Burials at the Church of St. James the Less